Haiti in Action, previously L'Artibonite in Action, is a political party in Haiti.

In the 7 February 2006 Senate elections the party won 2.7% of the popular vote and two out of 30 Senators. In the 7 February and 21 April 2006 Chamber of Deputies elections, the party won 5 out of 99 seats. In October 2011, the party received the portfolio for the Ministry of Youth, Sports, and Civic Action.

For the 2015 parliamentary elections, the party presented 4 candidates for the Senate and 36 for the Chamber of Deputies.

References

2015 establishments in Haiti
Federalist parties
Haitian nationalism
Nationalist parties in North America
Political parties established in 2015
Political parties in Haiti